Exaeretia ledereri is a moth of the family Depressariidae. It is found in Romania and North Macedonia and on Cyprus. It has also been recorded from Turkey, Turkmenistan and Israel.

References

External links
lepiforum.de

Moths described in 1854
Exaeretia
Moths of Europe
Moths of Asia